Jia Xu (147 – 11 August 223), courtesy name Wenhe, was an official of the state of Cao Wei during the early Three Kingdoms period of China. He started his career in the late Eastern Han dynasty as a minor official. In 189, when the warlord Dong Zhuo took control of the Han central government, he assigned Jia Xu to the unit led by Niu Fu, his son-in-law. In May 192, after Dong Zhuo was assassinated by Lü Bu, Jia Xu advised Li Jue, Guo Si and Dong Zhuo's loyalists to fight back and seize control of the imperial capital, Chang'an, from a new central government headed by Lü Bu and Wang Yun. After Li Jue and the others defeated Lü Bu and occupied Chang'an, Jia Xu served under the central government led by them. During this time, he ensured the safety of the figurehead Han emperor, Emperor Xian, who was being held hostage by Li Jue. He also attempted to prevent internal conflict between Li Jue and Guo Si, but with limited success. After Emperor Xian escaped from Chang'an, Jia Xu left Li Jue and briefly joined the general Duan Wei before becoming a strategist of the warlord Zhang Xiu. While serving under Zhang Xiu, he advised his lord on how to counter invasions by the warlord Cao Cao, who had received Emperor Xian in 196 and taken control of the central government. In 200, during the Battle of Guandu between Cao Cao and his rival Yuan Shao, Jia Xu urged Zhang Xiu to reject Yuan Shao's offer to form an alliance and instead surrender to Cao Cao. Zhang Xiu heeded his advice. Jia Xu then became one of Cao Cao's strategists.

During his service under Cao Cao, Jia Xu made three important contributions. First, during the Battle of Guandu, he urged Cao Cao to switch from being on the defensive to adopting an offensive stance, which ultimately led to Cao Cao's decisive victory over Yuan Shao. Second, during the Battle of Tong Pass in 211, he suggested to Cao Cao to pretend to agree to make peace with the northwestern warlords Han Sui and Ma Chao, and then sow discord between them. Cao Cao heeded his suggestion, successfully stirred up internal conflict among the warlords, and then used the opportunity to defeat them. Thirdly, in the 210s, when Cao Cao's sons Cao Pi and Cao Zhi were fighting to be their father's successor, Jia Xu indirectly helped Cao Pi by giving him advice and hinting to Cao Cao that he should choose the older son to be his heir apparent. After Cao Cao's death in 220, Cao Pi ended the Eastern Han dynasty by forcing Emperor Xian to abdicate the throne to him, and founded the state of Cao Wei with himself as the emperor. As an expression of gratitude to Jia Xu, Cao Pi appointed him as Grand Commandant – one of the top three positions in the Wei government – and promoted him to a district marquis. Between 220 and 223, Jia Xu advised Cao Pi against attacking Cao Wei's rival states, Eastern Wu and Shu Han, and focus on internal development. However, Cao Pi ignored his advice and invaded Wu, but ended up sustaining heavy losses and not making any significant gains. Jia Xu died in 223.

Early life and career
Jia Xu was from Guzang County (姑臧縣), Wuwei Commandery (武威郡), which is in present-day Wuwei, Gansu. In his youth, he was unimpressive and unheard of. However, Yan Zhong (閻忠), an official from Hanyang Commandery (漢陽郡; around present-day Gangu County, Gansu), felt that Jia Xu was extraordinary and even remarked that Jia had the brilliance of Zhang Liang and Chen Ping, two famous strategists of the early Western Han dynasty.

Jia Xu was nominated as a xiaolian to serve in the Eastern Han government as a Gentleman Cadet (郎). However, due to illness, he quit his job and went home. On the way back, he was captured by Di rebels at Qian County (汧縣; in present-day Long County, Shaanxi) along with several other travellers. He told the rebels: "I am a maternal grandson of Lord Duan. If you let me live, my family will reward you handsomely." "Lord Duan" referred to Duan Jiong (段熲), who held the position of Grand Commandant (太尉) in the Han imperial court. As Duan Jiong had served for years as a general guarding the Han Empire's western regions, he was well known among the people living in the area. Jia Xu knew that the Di rebels were afraid of Duan Jiong, so he pretended to be Duan Jiong's maternal grandson. As he expected, the rebels treated him respectfully and released him. The other travellers were all killed.

Service under Dong Zhuo
In 189, the warlord Dong Zhuo entered the imperial capital, Luoyang, and took control of the central government. Jia Xu was then serving as the Commandant (都尉) of Pingjin (平津) and an assistant official in the Grand Commandant's office. He was promoted to Colonel Who Attacks Barbarians (討虜校尉) and assigned to the unit led by Dong Zhuo's son-in-law, Niu Fu.

In 192, Dong Zhuo was assassinated by Lü Bu in the imperial capital, Chang'an, while Niu Fu was murdered by his subordinates. The rest of Dong Zhuo's loyalists, including Li Jue, Guo Si and Zhang Ji, became fearful and wanted to disband and return to their respective home commanderies. Jia Xu told them: "I heard that the new government in Chang'an is planning to exterminate everyone from Liang Province. If all of you break up and travel alone, even a tingzhang can arrest you. Why don't you retreat to the west together? There you can gather and reorganise your forces, and then attack Chang'an to avenge Lord Dong. If you succeed, you can make use of imperial authority to conquer the rest of the Empire. If you fail, it's still not too late to escape." Dong Zhuo's loyalists agreed with Jia Xu and did as he suggested. They managed to defeat the new central government in Chang'an led by Lü Bu and Wang Yun, and then took control of the city.

Pei Songzhi, who annotated Jia Xu's biography in the Sanguozhi, strongly criticised Jia Xu for offering this suggestion. He argued that Dong Zhuo's death marked the end of his tyranny and a possible revival of the declining Eastern Han dynasty. However, due to Jia Xu's suggestion, the Han Empire became even more chaotic after Dong Zhuo's death.

Service under Li Jue
When Jia Xu later served as Left Adjunct (左馮翊), Li Jue and Dong Zhuo's loyalists wanted to reward him by making him a marquis, but Jia Xu said, "That suggestion I made was meant to save your lives. What merit have I achieved to deserve a reward?" He declined to accept the marquis title. Later on, when he was nominated to serve as a Supervisor of the Masters of Writing (尚書僕射), he said: "The Supervisor of the Masters of Writing is like a tutor to officials. I don't have a strong reputation so I am afraid I might not be able to convince people that I am suited for this appointment. What will become of the imperial court if I accept this appointment for my personal glory?" He was then assigned to be a Master of Writing (尚書) instead, and was tasked with selecting candidates to serve in the government. Li Jue and the others regarded him highly but were also wary of him. The candidates Jia Xu chose tend to be officials who formerly served in the previous administration. Jia Xu was praised for this mode of selecting government officials by retaining some continuity in appointments. When there were tensions between Li Jue, Guo Si and Fan Chou, with their respective subordinates urging them to go to war, Jia Xu reprimanded them for their behaviour and tried to persuade them to avoid conflict. They listened to him.

When his mother died, Jia Xu resigned and went home for filial mourning. He was given the honorary position of a Household Counsellor (光祿大夫) by the imperial court. In 195, when conflict broke out between Li Jue and Guo Si in Chang'an, Li invited Jia Xu back to serve as General Who Upholds Righteousness (宣義將軍). Li Jue and his men discussed with Jia Xu their plan to bring Emperor Xian to their camp and use the emperor as a hostage to threaten Guo Si, but Jia Xu said: "No, it isn't right to hold the Emperor hostage." Li Jue refused to listen to him and went ahead. Guo Si, on the other hand, kidnapped Emperor Xian's subjects and held them hostage in his own camp. Zhang Xiu told Jia Xu, "You shouldn't stay here any longer. Why don't you leave?" Jia Xu replied, "I have received grace from the Empire, so I won't betray the Empire's trust in me. If you wish to leave, you can go. I won't leave."

Li Jue used material wealth to tempt thousands of Qiang tribesmen to support him in his struggle against Guo Si. He even promised to give palace women as concubines to the tribal chiefs. When the tribesmen showed up at Chang'an, they asked: "Is the Emperor inside? General Li has promised to give us palace women as concubines. Where are they?" Emperor Xian turned to Jia Xu for help. Jia Xu secretly hosted a banquet for the tribal chiefs, gave them some expensive material gifts, and succeeded in making them leave. Li Jue lost the support of the tribal chiefs. Jia Xu played an important role in resolving the conflict between Li Jue and Guo Si, and in ensuring Emperor Xian's safety during the time. Later, after Emperor Xian escaped from Chang'an, Li Jue led his forces in pursuit and defeated forces led by the emperor's loyalists. He hated certain officials such as Zhao Wen (趙溫), Wang Wei (王偉), Zhou Zhong (周忠) and Rong Shao (榮邵), and wanted to execute them. Jia Xu advised him against it by saying: "They are the Emperor's subjects. How can you harm them?" Li Jue spared them.

Brief service under Duan Wei
After Emperor Xian left Chang'an, Jia Xu gave up his official post and left Li Jue. He heard that the general Duan Wei (段煨), who was from the same commandery as him, was stationed at Huayin County (華陰縣; present-day Huayin, Shaanxi), so he went to Huayin County to join Duan Wei. Jia Xu was well known among Duan Wei's men, so Duan Wei was fearful that Jia Xu would seize the position of leadership from him. He pretended to treat Jia Xu respectfully while secretly keeping a close watch on him. Jia Xu knew that Duan Wei was suspicious of him, and he felt very uneasy.

Around 196, the warlord Zhang Xiu was based in Nanyang Commandery (南陽郡; around present-day Nanyang, Henan). Jia Xu secretly contacted Zhang Xiu and conveyed his intention to join him; Zhang Xiu agreed and sent his men to receive Jia Xu. Before Jia Xu left Duan Wei, someone asked him, "(Duan) Wei treated you generously. Why are you leaving?" Jia Xu replied, "(Duan) Wei is suspicious by nature and he's wary of me. Even though he treats me generously now, I believe he will harm me eventually. However, if I leave now, he will be more than happy to see me gone. If I manage to help him find an external ally, he will treat my family well. (Zhang) Xiu lacks a strategist, so he definitely hopes to have me on his side. By leaving, I can protect myself and my family."

Service under Zhang Xiu

Jia Xu left Duan Wei and headed to Nanyang Commandery, where Zhang Xiu welcomed him and treated him like a family elder. As Jia Xu foresaw, Duan Wei was pleased to see that Jia Xu had not only left, but also helped him gain Zhang Xiu as an ally. Jia Xu urged Zhang Xiu to form an alliance with Liu Biao, the Governor of Jing Province, and went to speak to Liu Biao. Liu Biao treated him like an honoured guest. Jia Xu remarked: "(Liu) Biao has the ability to serve as a Ducal Minister in times of peace. However, he not only lacks foresight, but is also suspicious and indecisive, hence he won't be successful."

Battles against Cao Cao

In 198, the warlord Cao Cao attacked Zhang Xiu again despite having suffered an earlier defeat at the Battle of Wancheng in 197. However, he pulled back his forces after learning that Tian Feng, an adviser to his rival, Yuan Shao, had urged Yuan Shao to attack Xu (許; present-day Xuchang, Henan) while he was away at war with Zhang Xiu. Zhang Xiu wanted to seize the opportunity to launch a counterattack, but Jia Xu warned him not to and predicted that he would be lose the battle. Zhang Xiu ignored him and led his troops to pursue Cao Cao's retreating forces. The result was just like what Jia Xu predicted. When Zhang Xiu came back after his defeat, Jia Xu told him to attack again and predicted that he would win this time. Zhang Xiu said: "I didn't listen to you earlier, which resulted in my defeat. Now that I have lost, why should I attack again?" Jia Xu replied: "Changes have taken place. You'll win if you swiftly attack now." Zhang Xiu heeded Jia Xu's advice and attacked Cao Cao again. He won the battle this time.

Zhang Xiu asked Jia Xu: "When I led my best troops to attack Cao Cao while he was retreating, you predicted I would lose. When I led my troops to attack Cao Cao again just after he defeated me, you predicted I would win. Your predictions turned out to be accurate. But why is it that your predictions seem so counter-intuitive?" Jia Xu replied: "It's easy to understand. General, you may be skilled in warfare, but you are still no match for Cao Cao. When Cao Cao withdrew his forces, I knew he would personally lead his rearguard to cover his retreat. Even though your troops are well-trained, Cao Cao is better than you as a military leader, and his troops are as equally well-trained as yours. Therefore, I knew you would lose. When Cao Cao first attacked you and decided to retreat halfway even though he didn't make any mistakes, I believed something must have happened in his base. After he defeated your pursuing forces, he would lower his guard and hastily retreat. His officers will then take command of the rearguard. They may be brave, but they are no match for you. Therefore, I knew you would win them even though you are leading a group of soldiers who have just been defeated." Zhang Xiu was very impressed with Jia Xu's analysis.

Persuading Zhang Xiu to surrender to Cao Cao
In 199, when Cao Cao and Yuan Shao were about to clash at the Battle of Guandu, Yuan Shao sent a messenger to meet Zhang Xiu and propose an alliance between them against Cao Cao. Zhang Xiu wanted to agree, but Jia Xu, who was beside him, said to Yuan Shao's messenger: "I say 'No, thank you.' to Yuan Benchu. He can't even accommodate his own brother. What makes him think he can accommodate talents from around the Empire?" A shocked Zhang Xiu turned to Jia Xu and asked: "Why do you have to say this? What will become of me now?" Jia Xu replied: "Why don't you submit to Cao Cao?" Zhang Xiu asked: "Yuan Shao is powerful while Cao Cao is weak. Besides, I am also Cao Cao's enemy. What will happen if I submit to him?" Jia Xu replied: "That's why it is better for you to submit to Cao Cao. He controls the Empire in the name of the Emperor. This is the first reason why you should submit to him. Yuan Shao is militarily more powerful. You have less troops than him, so even if you join him, he won't regard you highly. Cao Cao has less troops. If you join him, he'll be delighted. This is the second reason why you should submit to him. A man who aspires to become a great ruler will be more willing to put aside personal enmities and make his virtues known to people. This is the third reason why you should submit to Cao Cao. I hope you won't have any more doubts." Zhang Xiu heeded Jia Xu's advice and led his forces to surrender to and join Cao Cao.

Service under Cao Cao
Cao Cao was very pleased to see Jia Xu. He held Jia Xu's hand and said: "You are the person who helps to make my trustworthiness known throughout the Empire." Jia Xu was appointed Bearer of the Mace (執金吾) and enfeoffed as a Marquis of a Chief Village (都亭侯). He was later promoted to the position of Governor (牧) of Ji Province. As Ji Province was still under Yuan Shao's control then, Jia Xu served as a military adviser to Cao Cao, who then held the appointment of Minister of Works (司空).

Advising Cao Cao during the Battle of Guandu
During the Battle of Guandu, when his supplies were running out after a prolonged stalemate against Yuan Shao, Cao Cao sought advice from Jia Xu, who said: "My lord, you're wiser than (Yuan) Shao, braver than (Yuan) Shao, better at managing people than (Yuan) Shao, and more decisive than (Yuan) Shao. You have these four strengths, but the reason why you are unable to defeat him after six months is because you have been focusing too much on defence. You should be decisive when the opportunity arises, and victory will follow soon." Cao Cao replied, "Fine." He then led his forces to attack Yuan Shao's camps, which were spread out a distance of over 30 li, and destroyed them. Cao Cao won a decisive victory over Yuan Shao at the Battle of Guandu and subsequently conquered the rest of Yuan's territories north of the Yellow River.

Advising Cao Cao against attacking Sun Quan
When Cao Cao was appointed as the Governor of Ji Province after pacifying northern China, Jia Xu was reassigned to be a Palace Counsellor (太中大夫) instead. In 208, after Cao Cao had annexed Jing Province, he planned to press on and attack the territories in Jiangdong controlled by the warlord Sun Quan. Jia Xu advised him against it and said: "My lord, you have defeated the Yuans and now you have taken Jing Province. Your name spreads throughout the Empire and your military is very strong. If you follow in the footsteps of the Chu state by attracting talents to serve in the government and by improving the lives of the people, you won't need to resort to force to subdue the Jiangdong territories. They will be submit to you on their own." Cao Cao ignored Jia Xu and proceeded to attack Jiangdong. He lost the decisive Battle of Red Cliffs against the allied forces of Sun Quan and Liu Bei later that year.

Pei Songzhi, who annotated Jia Xu's biography in the Sanguozhi, argued that Jia Xu's advice to Cao Cao was inappropriate. He pointed out that Cao Cao's territories lacked the stability necessary for Cao Cao to do as Jia Xu advised – focus on economic development in Jing Province. Moreover, Cao Cao had to deal with the external threats posed by warlords such as Han Sui and Ma Chao in the northwest. Pei Songzhi noted that Jing Province was highly unstable and would not remain under Cao Cao's control for long, because of the polarising effects of the presences of Liu Bei and Sun Quan in the region. He pointed out that during the Battle of Jiangling in 208, Cao Cao's general Cao Ren still lost Jiangling Commandery to Sun Quan and Liu Bei's forces despite his best efforts at defending it. Pei Songzhi thus concluded that it was impossible for Cao Cao to focus on economic development in Jing Province, given how unstable the region was, therefore Jia Xu's advice was inappropriate. He argued that Cao Cao made a right choice to attack Jiangdong at the right time, when he had resources for naval warfare acquired from his recent annexation of Jing Province. He also mentioned that Cao Cao's defeat at the Battle of Red Cliffs was not due to miscalculation or poor planning, but because of uncontrollable factors such as the plague which affected his troops and the winds which fanned the fire that destroyed his naval fleet.

Advising Cao Cao during the Battle of Tong Pass

In 211, Cao Cao engaged a coalition of northwestern warlords led by Han Sui and Ma Chao at the Battle of Tong Pass. Ma Chao and others agreed to make peace with Cao Cao on two conditions. Firstly, Cao Cao had to give up the northwestern territories to them. Secondly, Cao Cao had to grant them official titles. Jia Xu suggested that Cao Cao pretend to agree to their terms, and then try to sow discord among them. Cao Cao heeded Jia Xu's advice. When internal conflict broke out between Han Sui and Ma Chao, Cao Cao took advantage of the situation to attack them and achieved victory.

Role in the succession struggle between Cao Pi and Cao Zhi
Sometime between 211 and 217, a power struggle broke out between two of Cao Cao's sons over the succession to the "King of Wei" (魏王), the nominal vassal king title held by their father. One of them was Cao Pi, Cao Cao's oldest surviving son, who held the appointment of General of the Household for All Purposes (五官中郎將). The other was Cao Zhi, who held the title "Marquis of Linzi" (臨菑侯) and was famous for his literary talent. Each of them had a faction supporting him.

Cao Pi sent a messenger to meet Jia Xu and seek his advice on how to consolidate his position. Jia Xu replied: "I hope you will behave in a virtuous and humble manner, perform your duties faithfully, and be a filial son. That is all." Cao Pi took Jia Xu's advice very seriously and did as he was told.

Cao Cao faced a dilemma on choosing between his two sons so he consulted Jia Xu, who refused to give an answer. Cao Cao asked him: "Why don't you give an answer?" Jia Xu replied: "I am still thinking about something, so I can't give an answer yet." Cao Cao asked, "What are you thinking of?" Jia Xu replied, "I am thinking of Yuan Benchu, Liu Jingsheng, and their sons." Cao Cao laughed, made up his mind, and designated Cao Pi as his heir apparent.

Jia Xu was aware that he had not served under Cao Cao for as long as many of his colleagues. He foresaw that he might incur the jealousy and suspicions of others, hence he maintained a very low profile and distanced himself from his colleagues outside of the workplace. He also ensured that his children did not marry people from influential families. He earned the respect and admiration of many strategists and advisers.

Service under Cao Pi
On 6 April 220, while Cao Pi was still King of Wei, Jia Xu was appointed as Grand Commandant (太尉). In late 220, Cao Pi forced Emperor Xian to abdicate the throne to him, thus ending the Han dynasty. He then established the state of Wei with himself as its first emperor. After ascending the throne, Jia Xu remained as Grand Commandant; he was also promoted from a Marquis of a Chief Village to the Marquis of Weishou District (魏壽鄉侯), with a marquisate of 800 taxable households. Jia Xu's promotion was allegedly an expression of gratitude from Cao Pi, who wanted to thank him for helping him seize the succession years ago. Sun Quan laughed when he heard that Cao Pi had appointed Jia Xu as his Grand Commandant.

Advising Cao Pi against attacking Eastern Wu

Sometime between 220 and 223, Cao Pi wanted to attack and conquer Wei's two rival states, Wu and Shu. He consulted Jia Xu on which of the two he should attack first.

Jia Xu replied: "Before you can conquer others, you have to build up military power first. Before you can establish a power base, you have to promote civil culture. Your Majesty has received the Mandate of Heaven in a timely fashion and now rules over the Empire. If you can promote civil culture while waiting for an opportunity to strike, it won't be difficult for you to conquer your enemies. Wu and Shu may be small and insignificant states, but they are shielded by natural geographical barriers such as mountains and rivers. Liu Bei has talent and great ambition; Zhuge Liang excels in statecraft; Sun Quan understands trends and sees through deception; Lu Yi assesses military power very well. They control geographically advantageous locations, and have set up defences at strategic points and the rivers and lakes. It is not easy to plan an attack. According to military strategy, you should gain the upper hand first before actually fighting a battle. You should assess the enemy's strength, and then decide which generals to send into battle. This is to ensure that you don't miscalculate. From my observation, none of our officials are capable of rivalling (Liu) Bei and (Sun) Quan. Even though you may fight a war with the prestige of an Emperor, you can't win without making significant losses. In the past, Shun ordered his troops to brandish their weapons to scare the Youmiao into submission. As of now, I think it is better to focus on civil affairs first before military affairs."

Cao Pi refused to listen to Jia Xu. In 223, Wei sustained heavy losses at the Battle of Jiangling against Wu.

Death
Jia Xu died on 11 August 223 at the age of 77 (by East Asian age reckoning). He was given the posthumous title "Marquis Su" (肅侯).

Family and descendants
According to the Xin Tang Shu, Jia Xu descended from the royal family of the Zhou dynasty. His ancestor was Gongming (公明), the youngest son of Shuyu (a son of King Wu of Zhou). Gongming was enfeoffed by King Kang of Zhou as the Count of Jia (賈伯) and given the lands around Linfen as his fief, which was named "Jia". His descendants adopted "Jia" as their family name. Jia Yi, a notable scholar-politician who lived in the Western Han dynasty, was an ancestor of Jia Xu. Jia Xu's father, Jia Gong (賈龔), served as a General of Light Cavalry (輕騎將軍) in the Eastern Han dynasty and moved his residence to Wuwei Commandery, where Jia Xu was born. Jia Xu had an elder brother, Jia Cai (賈綵).

Jia Xu had at least three sons. His eldest son, Jia Mu (賈穆), was a Chief Commandant of Escorting Cavalry (駙馬都尉). After Jia Xu's death, Jia Mu inherited his father's marquis title, Marquis of Weishou District (魏壽鄉侯). He also served as the Administrator (太守) of various commanderies. Jia Xu's youngest son, Jia Fang (賈訪), was given a marquis title and 200 taxable households around the same time as when Jia Xu was enfeoffed as the Marquis of Weishou District. According to the Xin Tang Shu, Jia Xu had a son, Jia Ji (賈璣), who also served as a Chief Commandant of Escorting Cavalry like Jia Mu, and held the title of a Secondary Marquis (關內侯). Jia Ji is not mentioned in Jia Xu's official biography in the Sanguozhi.

When Jia Mu died, his marquis title was passed on to his son, Jia Mo (賈模). According to the Shiyu (世語), Jia Mo served as a Regular Mounted Attendant (散騎常侍) and General Who Protects the Army (護軍將軍) during the reign of Emperor Hui in the Western Jin dynasty. Jia Mo had two sons, Jia Yin (賈胤) and Jia Kan (賈龕). Jia Yin, Jia Kan, and their cousin Jia Pi, served in the Jin government and held high official positions.

Writings
Jia Xu annotated the military treatise Wuzi and wrote another military text called Wu Sun Zi Sanshi'er Lei Jing (吳孫子三十二壘經). He also created a copy of Sun Tzu's The Art of War.

Appraisal
Chen Shou, who wrote Jia Xu's biography in the Sanguozhi, appraised him as follows: "Xun You and Jia Xu were very detailed in their strategising and had never miscalculated before. However, in terms of adaptability and flexibility, they were second to (Zhang) Liang and (Chen) Ping."

Pei Songzhi, who annotated the Sanguozhi, disagreed with Chen Shou. He believed that biographies should be categorised in the same volume on the basis of similarities. He argued that Jia Xu's biography should be in the same volume as the biographies of Cheng Yu and Guo Jia rather than in the same volume as the biographies of Xun Yu and Xun You. In Pei Songzhi's opinion, Jia Xu was more similar to the former two than to the latter two. Pei Songzhi even remarked, "The difference between the moral characters of Xun You and Jia Xu is like the difference between moonlight and candlelight. Both give off light, but they are fundamentally different." He also criticised Chen Shou for appraising Xun You and Jia Xu in the same sentence instead of appraising them separately.

In popular culture

Jia Xu was first introduced as a playable character in the seventh instalment of Koei's Dynasty Warriors video game series.

See also
 Lists of people of the Three Kingdoms

Notes

References
Citations from the Sanguozhi

Citations from the Sanguozhi zhu

Other citations

 Chen, Shou (3rd century). Records of the Three Kingdoms (Sanguozhi).
 
 Luo, Guanzhong (14th century). Romance of the Three Kingdoms (Sanguo Yanyi).
 Ouyang, Xiu, and Song, Qi (eds.) (1060). New Book of Tang (Xin Tang Shu).
 Pei, Songzhi (5th century). Annotations to Records of the Three Kingdoms (Sanguozhi zhu).
 Sima, Guang (1084). Zizhi Tongjian.
 Wei, Zheng (ed.) (636). Book of Sui (Sui Shu).

Dong Zhuo and associates
Liu Biao and associates
Officials under Cao Cao
147 births
223 deaths
People from Wuwei
Han dynasty politicians from Gansu
Cao Wei politicians